Chernov's snake skink (Ophiomorus chernovi) is a species of skink, a lizard in the family Scincidae. The species is native to Western Asia and Central Asia.

Etymology
The specific name, chernovi, is in honor of Russian herpetologist Sergius Alexandrovich Chernov.

Geographic range
O. chernovi is found in Iran and Turkmenistan.

Description
O. chernovi has four digits on each front foot, and it has three digits on each hind foot. It has 24 scale rows around the body at midbody. The snout is cuneiform.

Reproduction
O. chernovi is viviparous.

References

Further reading
Anderson SC, Leviton AE (1966). "A review of the genus Ophiomorus (Sauria: Scincidae), with descriptions of three new forms". Proceedings of the California Academy of Sciences, Fourth Series 33 (16): 499–534. (Ophiomorus chernovi, new species, pp. 503–510, Figures 2a, 2b, 3a).
Nasrabadi R, Rastegar-Pouyani N, Rastegar-Pouyani E, Gharzi A (2017). "A revised key to the lizards of Iran (Reptilia: Squamata: Lacertilia)". Zootaxa 4227 (3): 431–443.
Sindaco R, Jeremčenko VK (2008). The Reptiles of the Western Palearctic. 1. Annotated Checklist and Distributional Atlas of the Turtles, Crocodiles, Amphisbaenians and Lizards of Europe, North Africa, Middle East and Central Asia. (Monographs of the Societas Herpetologica Italica). Latina, Italy: Edizioni Belvedere. 580 pp. .

Ophiomorus
Taxa named by Steven C. Anderson
Taxa named by Alan E. Leviton
Reptiles described in 1966